Centranthus trinervis is a species of plant in the family Caprifoliaceae. It is endemic to Corsica, France where there is a single sub-population of which the only 140 of the individual plants remain. The common name of the plant is Centranthe À Trois Nervures in French.
Its natural habitat is Mediterranean-type shrubby vegetation. It is currently threatened by habitat loss.

It is considered by IUCN as one of the 50 most endangered species of the Mediterranean area.

References

trinervis
Critically endangered plants
Flora of Corsica
Endemic flora of France
Taxonomy articles created by Polbot
Plants described in 1903